Melanie Roach (née Kosoff; born December 15, 1974 in  The Dalles, Oregon) is an Olympic weightlifter for the United States.  She lives in Bonney Lake, Washington where she owns Roach Gymnastics, Inc.

During high school, Melanie participated in gymnastics, but dislocated her shoulder. After reconstructive surgery, she slowly became interested in weightlifting. She started training in 1994 once meeting coach John Thrush at Calpian Weightlifting Club. By 1998 she was number one in the US, and set the world record, since bested, for the women's clean & jerk by lifting more than twice her weight, 113 kg/250 lbs. She is 5'2" and 117 lbs.

Three weeks before the US Olympic Trials in 2000, she herniated a disc in her back, and became an alternate. She then focused on starting a family with husband Dan Roach, who is currently serving his fourth term as a Republican in the Washington House of Representatives from the 31st District. Dan is the son of Pam Roach, who is serving her fifth term as a Washington State Senator. She then started training again in 2005, made it past the Olympic Trials, and into the 2008 Summer Olympics. There, she lifted 83 kg in the snatch, a new personal record, 110 kg in the clean & jerk, and a total of 193 kg, a new personal and American record. She placed 6th out of 9.

Roach is a member of the Church of Jesus Christ of Latter-Day Saints.

Weightlifting achievements
Gold Medalist in US Nationals (1998-2000, 2003, 2006-2008)
Participant in World Weightlifting Championships (1998)
13th Place in World Weightlifting Championships (1999)
12th Place in World Weightlifting Championships (2006)
12th Place in World Weightlifting Championships (2007)
Bronze Medalist in Pan Am Championships (2006)
Bronze Medalist in Pan Am Games (2007)
6th Place in Olympic Games (2008)

References

External links
Melanieroach.com
M. Roach snatching 78 kg (172 lb)
M. Roach after snatching 78 kg (172 lb)
Melanie Roach at Weightlifting Exchange

1974 births
Living people
People from The Dalles, Oregon
American Latter Day Saints
Olympic weightlifters of the United States
Weightlifters at the 2007 Pan American Games
Weightlifters at the 2008 Summer Olympics
American female weightlifters
Pan American Games bronze medalists for the United States
Pan American Games medalists in weightlifting
Weightlifters at the 2015 Pan American Games
People from Bonney Lake, Washington
Medalists at the 2007 Pan American Games
20th-century American women
21st-century American women